Khrestivka or Kirovske, also Kirovskoye is a city of regional significance in Donetsk Oblast, Ukraine. Its population is approximately

History 
On 14 April 2014 pro-Russian activists captured Kirovske's town hall and declared that the city was part of the separatist Donetsk People's Republic (DPR). Since then the city has remained under DPR and Russian occupation.

On 12 May 2016, the Ukrainian parliament renamed the city Kirovske back to Khrestivka (its historic name) under decommunization laws. The DPR and Russian occupying forces do not recognize the name change.

Demographics
As of the Ukrainian Census of 2001:
Ethnicity
 Ukrainians: 54.2%
 Russians: 41.6%
 Belarusians: 1.4%
 Azerbaijanis: 0.5%
 Tatars: 0.4%

Language
Russian: 82.39%
Ukrainian: 16.90%
Belarusian: 0.15%
Armenian: 0.05%

References

Cities in Donetsk Oblast
Populated places established in the Ukrainian Soviet Socialist Republic
Cities of regional significance in Ukraine
Soviet toponymy in Ukraine
City name changes in Ukraine
Horlivka Raion